Fariborz Gerami (born 3 May 1993) is an Iranian football midfielder who currently plays  for Saipa.

References

1993 births
Living people
Iranian footballers
Association football defenders
Sportspeople from Sari, Iran
Pars Jonoubi Jam players